Carl Grewesmühl  (1877–1950) was a Swedish politician. He was a member of the Centre Party.

References
This article was initially translated from the Swedish Wikipedia article.

Centre Party (Sweden) politicians
1877 births
1950 deaths